Marcia K. Johnson (born 1943) is a Sterling Professor emeritus of psychology at Yale University. She was born in 1943 in Alameda, California. Johnson attended public schools in Oakland and Ventura. She attended the University of California Berkeley where she received both her B.A. in 1965 and Ph.D. in 1971. In 1970 Johnson moved to Long Island, New York to take a faculty position at The State University of New York at Stony Brook, where she worked until 1985. She then accepted a position at Princeton University and was there from 1985-2000. Johnson  is currently a Sterling Professor Emerita of psychology at Yale University since 2000.  

While in her undergraduate program, she conducted her first psychological experiment, and found that people were better able to identify stimuli in an ambiguous environment if they had encoded the targets in terms of holistic schemas or concepts than if they had differentiated among them on the basis of specific features. She also received two research assistant opportunities with Lloyd Peterson and Kathleen Archibald, both afforded her with models of engaged academics. In graduate school she mentored with Leo Postman and Geoffrey Keppel at Berkeley’s Institute of Human Learning, where she investigated organizational processes in memory. She became the Dilley Professor of Psychology in 2004, and was appointed as a Sterling Professor in 2011. Her former graduate students include Shahin Hashtroudi, Frank Durso, Mary Ann Foley, Tracey Kahan, Steve Lindsay, Elizabeth Phelps, Kristi Multhaup, Chad Dodson, Denise Evert, Mara Mather, John Reeder, Wil Cunningham, and Keith Lyle.

Johnson has received  American Psychological Association Distinguished Scientific Contribution Award, the American Psychological Society William James Fellow Award, and a Guggenheim Fellowship. In 2014, she was elected to the National Academy of Sciences.

Johnson is the director of the Memory and Cognition Lab (MEMlab) at Yale.

References

American women psychologists
American cognitive scientists
Women cognitive scientists
Yale University faculty
Yale Sterling Professors
University of California, Berkeley alumni
1943 births
Living people
American women academics
21st-century American women